She-Wolf of London may refer to:

 She-Wolf of London (film), 1946 American mystery and horror film
 She-Wolf of London (TV series), American television series